Cardiology in Review is a bimonthly peer-reviewed medical journal covering cardiology. It was established in 2011 and is published by Lippincott Williams & Wilkins. The editors-in-chief are William H. Frishman (New York Medical College) and Patrick T. O'Gara (Brigham & Women's Hospital).

Aims and scope 
The aim of the journal is to publish comprehensive, and authoritative reviews for practicing clinicians. Topical coverage includes diagnosis, clinical courses, prevention, and treatment of cardiovascular disorders. Publishing formats are invited reviews, unsolicited critiques, and unsolicited comprehensive analysis, all pertaining to cardiovascular disease and treatment.

Abstracting and indexing 
The journal is abstracted and indexed in:
Science Citation Index Expanded
Current Contents/Clinical Medicine
MEDLINE - PubMed, and Index medicus
EMBASE
Scopus

Notable articles

External links 
 

Cardiology journals
Publications established in 1993
English-language journals
Lippincott Williams & Wilkins academic journals
Bimonthly journals